The 1971 CONCACAF Champions' Cup was the 7th edition of the annual international club football competition held in the CONCACAF region (North America, Central America and the Caribbean), the CONCACAF Champions' Cup. It determined that year's club champion of association football in the CONCACAF region. It was played from 22 August 1971 till 19 April 1972 under the home/away match system.

The teams were split into 3 zones (North American, Central American and Caribbean), each one qualifying two teams to the final tournament, played for the first time in a group system. After the end of the group, a playoff match had to be played because two teams ended with the same points in the lead of the group. This tournament included the Rochester Lancers, the only team from the original North American Soccer League to take part.

Cruz Azul from Mexico won the final, and became for the third time in its history became CONCACAF champion.

North American Zone

 Cruz Azul and Rochester Lancers advanced to the CONCACAF Final Tournament.

Central American Zone

Preliminary round

 Comunicaciones advanced to the First Round.

First round

 Aurora, Saprissa, Comunicaciones and Alajuelense advanced to the Second Round.

Second round

Caribbean Zone

CONCACAF Final Tournament

After the end of the group stage a playoff match had to be played due to Cruz Azul and Alajuelense ended with the same points in the lead of the group.
The final tournament was played in Guatemala City.

Playoff

Champion

References

c
1
c
c